Bhreagh MacNeil is a Canadian actress. She is most noted for her performance in the 2016 film Werewolf, for which she garnered a Canadian Screen Award nomination for Best Actress at the 5th Canadian Screen Awards. She also won the award for Best Actress in a Canadian Film at the Vancouver Film Critics Circle Awards 2016, and at the 2016 Atlantic Film Festival.

Originally from Big Pond, Nova Scotia, she studied theatre at Memorial University of Newfoundland's Grenfell Campus.

She stars in the 2020 film Queen of the Andes.

References

External links

Canadian film actresses
Canadian stage actresses
Actresses from Nova Scotia
Memorial University of Newfoundland alumni
Living people
People from the Cape Breton Regional Municipality
Canadian people of Scottish descent
Year of birth missing (living people)